Josephine Grima (born July 24, 1984) is a Maltese female professional basketball player.

External links
Profile at eurobasket.com

1984 births
Living people
People from Pietà, Malta
Maltese women's basketball players
Centers (basketball)